The Brooklyn Indians were an American basketball team based in Brooklyn, New York that was a member of the American Basketball League.

The team was previously known as the Camden Indians. The team moved to Brooklyn during the 1942/43 season on January 18, 1943. The team dropped out during the 1st half of the 1943/44 season.

Year-by-year

Basketball teams in New York City
Basketball teams established in 1943
Sports clubs disestablished in 1944
Sports in Brooklyn
1943 establishments in New York City
1944 disestablishments in New York (state)